Dermot O'Hurley (c. 1530 – 19 or 20 June 1584)—also Dermod or Dermond O'Hurley: —was the Roman Catholic Archbishop of Cashel during the Tudor conquest of Ireland. After being held and tortured in Dublin Castle, Archbishop O'Hurley was put to death, officially for high treason, but in reality as part of the religious persecution of the Catholic Church in Ireland by Queen Elizabeth I and her officials. He is one of the most celebrated of the 24 formally recognized Irish Catholic Martyrs, and was beatified by Pope John Paul II on 27 September 1992.

Early life
O'Hurley was born into the Gaelic nobility of Ireland, either in or near Emly, County Tipperary, around the year 1530. His father, William, was the O'Hurley clan's Chief of the Name and Bailiff of Emly, with duties similar to a Tacksman, for James FitzGerald, 14th Earl of Desmond. Dermot's mother was Honora Ni Brien, a descendant of the O'Brien dynasty. Both sides of the Archbishop's family claimed descent from the royal derbhfine of the  Dál gCais, one of the most powerful Irish clans in Munster's history. The future Archbishop had one sister named Honora Ni Hurley. The "William Oge O'Hurley" listed among the Desmond rebels to be pardoned is believed to have been the Archbishop's brother. He also had much younger brother named Andrew O'Hurley, whom, as of 1642, was over 80 years old, blind, paralyzed, and living in Portugal.

The future Archbishop is believed to have received his early education at a Cathedral school overseen by his kinsman, Bishop Thomas O'Hurley, in the monastery founded by Saint Ailbe of Emly. The O'Hurley family later moved to Lickadoon Castle, Ballyneety, County Limerick, where O'Hurley was educated by tutors and then sent to Flemish Brabant to study at the University of Leuven. In 1551 he graduated with a Master of Arts degree, then a doctorate of Law and was appointed a professor of philosophy in one of that university's greater colleges, where he remained for 15 years and acquired a reputation for his commentaries on Aristotle. In 1574 he was appointed a professor of canon and civil law in the Faculty of Law of Reims University by Louis de Guise, at which he spent 4 years.

Fugitive archbishop
In 1570 Pope Pius V excommunicated Queen Elizabeth I of England in the papal bull Regnans in Excelsis. This led to the Second Desmond Rebellion in 1579–83, which was still in progress when O'Hurley was required to travel to Ireland. On 11 September 1581, while still a layman, he was appointed Archbishop of Cashel by Pope Gregory XIII. He was ordained and consecrated and set out on his mission in 1583. Through its elaborate spy system, the government in Dublin Castle had immediate knowledge of Dermot's appointment to the See of Cashel, and Elizabeth's spies and priest hunters were soon on his tracks. 

Although it was later claimed by Lord Justices Adam Loftus and Henry Wallop in their letters to Sir Francis Walsingham that Archbishop O'Hurley had been employed by the Roman Inquisition, this is not sustainable by other evidence. For example, a 33-line work of praise poetry in Renaissance Latin, which was composed to celebrate Dermot O'Hurley's promotion to the Episcopate, confirms that he had always been merely a theology professor.

O'Hurley's voyage was fraught with danger because of the state of war between the Pope and England, but he accepted the risks involved and arranged for a sea captain from Drogheda to smuggle him from the French port of Le Croisic into Ireland. Archbishop O'Hurley disembarked upon Holmpatrick Strand in what is now Skerries, County Dublin in the autumn of 1583 and was met by a priest named Fr. John Dillon, who accompanied him to Drogheda, where they lodged in a hostelry.

His letters, which had been sent via a different ship, were intercepted by English pirates, who handed the letters over to the Lord Justices in Dublin.

After being advised by a resident of Drogheda that Lord Justices Loftus and Wallop already knew their location, Archbishop O'Hurley and Fr. Dillon decided to leave for Slane Castle, where they were allegedly concealed inside a priest hole.

While Archbishop O'Hurley lodged with Thomas Fleming, 10th Baron Slane, he covertly spread his activities through the territory of the Clan O'Reilly. While sheltering at Slane Castle, O'Hurley was recognised by the Baron's first cousin, Lord Chief Justice Sir Robert Dillon, who immediately informed Dublin Castle. Baron Slane was immediately summoned by Lord Justices Loftus and Wallop and, under pain of severe penalties, agreed to arrest Archbishop Dermot O'Hurley.

Meanwhile, the Archbishop had already left Slane Castle and was staying with Thomas Butler, 10th Earl of Ormond, a Protestant, referred to as "Black Thomas" (lit. "Thomas the Black", fig. "Thomas the Puritan"), who was then the Lord Treasurer of Ireland. While a guest at the Earl's still extant Elizabethan Manor House at Carrick-on-Suir, the Archbishop was covertly seeking a meeting with Dr. Miler Magrath, a former Franciscan Friar who had become the Church of Ireland's Archbishop of Cashel.

Immediately after making a pilgrimage to Holy Cross Abbey near Thurles in September 1583, Archbishop O'Hurley was met at Ormonde Castle by Baron Slane. The Baron explained the imminent danger to both himself and his family and in return, the Archbishop voluntarily agreed to travel with him and surrender at Dublin Castle.

During their journey, the conversation turned to the recent conversion to Anglicanism by Rt.-Rev. Peter Power, the Roman Catholic Bishop of Ferns. Archbishop O'Hurley commented about his former colleague, "Many who are lions before the battle are timid stags when the hour of trial comes. Lest this prove true of me, I daily pray to our good Lord for strength; for 'let him that thinketh himself to stand look lest he fall.'"

Meanwhile, despite his Protestantism, the Earl of Ormonde was greatly offended and distressed at the trickery used in the arrest of a guest in his house, and afterwards he did his best to rescue Archbishop O'Hurley from the executioners.

Imprisonment and torture

On 8 October 1583 Archbishop O'Hurley was handed over by Baron Slane to Lord Justices Wallop and Loftus and imprisoned in Dublin Castle. Under orders from both Loftus and Wallop, Edward Waterhouse, a senior member of the Irish Privy Council, conducted a series of interrogations of the Archbishop between 8 and 20 October 1583. The Archbishop admitted that he had been asked by the Cardinal Protector of Ireland to deliver sealed letters to the Rebel Earl and the other leaders of the Second Desmond Rebellion. O'Hurley explained, however, that he had chosen to leave those letters in France, as, "he would not meddle", in matters other than his religious mission, which, as he repeated insisted, was purely a peaceful one. Finding these results unsatisfactory, Loftus and Wallop wrote to Sir Francis Walsingham on 20 October 1583, seeking further instructions. 

In his response, Walsingham ordered both Justices to use, "torture or any other severe manner of proceeding" against the Archbishop, "to gain his knowledge of all foreign practices against Her Majesty's States."

In response, Loftus and Wallop wrote back upon 10 December that they lacked the necessary instruments of torture and recommended instead that Archbishop O'Hurley be transferred to the Tower of London. Instead, Walsingham ordered them to extract information from O'Hurley, "not only of any practice or disturbance pretended against the Land in particular, but also of any foreign conspiracy against Her Majesty in England or any other part of her dominions". Loftus and Wallop were ordered to try gentle persuasion at first, but if that failed, to "put him to the torture... which was to toast his feet against the fire with hot boots."

On 7 March 1584, Archbishop O'Hurley was accordingly subjected to the boiling boot. His bare feet were imprisoned in iron boots, filled with oil and water, that were slowly heated over a fire until the water boiled away both skin and flesh left the Archbishop's bones partially exposed. Yet, O'Hurley refused to embrace Protestantism or "confess" to any political offenses. Instead, he was heard to repeatedly cry out, "Jesus, Son of David, have mercy upon me"! 

After the torture was finally ceased on fear that the executioner might be punished for killing the Archbishop without orders, O'Hurley was returned to his cell inside Dublin Castle and received medical treatment from a fellow priest named Fr. Charles MacMorris. 

When the Archbishop had recovered enough to sit up and to limp a little, the Queen's officials sent visitors into Dublin Castle, including Thomas Jones, the Anglican Bishop of Meath, offering O'Hurley a high position within the Church of Ireland hierarchy in return for taking the Oath of Supremacy. Even his only sister, Honora Ni Hurley, according to David Rothe "was induced to go in and tempt him to apostatise and she urgently besought him to yield; but he, frowning on her, ordered her to fall at his knees and humbly beg pardon of God and absolution for so grave a crime against God, so hurtful to her own soul, and so abhorred by her brother."

According to surviving correspondence between Dublin and Whitehall, Queen Elizabeth I was reluctant to dispense with a fair trial under English Law, but her mind was changed by Sir Francis Walsingham at the urging of Loftus and Wallop, who alleged that a public trial would allow the Archbishop to make an "impudent and clamorous denial" of the charges against him. Loftus and Wallop also feared that a public trial by jury might result in an acquittal for "treasons committed in foreign parts against Her Majesty" owing to the lack of evidence that a crime had been committed and to the widespread Catholic sympathies within the Pale.

On 28 April 1584, a direct order was sent from Walsingham on behalf of the Queen, expressly forbidding the further use of torture, while also adding that it was the Queen's pleasure that Archbishop O'Hurley, "being so notorious and ill a Subject", should be executed.

Martyrdom

Upon learning that the Earl of Ormonde, by whose influence and power they feared Dermot O'Hurley's life would be saved, was coming to Dublin Castle to congratulate new Lord Deputy Sir John Perrot, Loftus and Wallop decided to put the Archbishop to death as soon as possible. On 19 June 1584, Loftus and Wallop, with Perrot's permission, issued a special commission to the Knight Marshal to, "do execution", upon Archbishop Dermot O'Hurley. In the early morning of 19, or 20, June 1584, O'Hurley was taken out of Dublin Castle at dawn. Despite efforts at both silence and secrecy, the Archbishop's fellow Catholic prisoners took notice and called out that O'Hurley was innocent. The former Bishop of Ferns, who, after learning of O'Hurley's constancy, had returned to Catholicism and been imprisoned, too, "called out aloud that he rather deserved that fate for the scandal he had formerly given, but that Hurley was an innocent and holy man. Upon which the jailer severely flogged him and the others, and so reduced them to silence."

As Lord Justice Henry Wallop and three or four guards went before him, the Archbishop was drawn on a hurdle through the Garden Gate, or Postern Gate, in the city walls of Dublin to be hanged in a forest at Hoggen Green. The usual location of the gallows in Elizabethan era Dublin was where Fitzwilliam Street and Baggot Street now intersect and between Fitzwilliam Street and Pembroke Street.

The execution party was taken by surprise by the arrival of a group of Dublin city worthies, who had come to Hoggen Green to shoot an archery match. In his speech from the gallows, the Archbishop proclaimed,

After also "forgiving his torturers with all his heart", the Archbishop was hanged and buried a nearby field. His body was secretly re-exhumed, placed in a wooden urn by London-born Recusant William Fitzsimon, and reburied in consecrated ground at St. Kevin's Church, Camden Row, Dublin. Many miracles are said to have been wrought at his gravesite, which remained a site of pilgrimage for many years.

Legacy
As word of his execution spread, O'Hurley was immediately revered as a martyr by Catholics throughout Europe. Several accounts of his life and death were printed and reached a wide audience.

In one of the great ironies of Irish history, Archbishop Adam Loftus, through his daughter Anne Loftus, who married Sir Henry Colley, was the ancestor of Arthur Wellesley, 1st Duke of Wellington. It was Wellington who, as Prime Minister of the United Kingdom in 1829, forced a bill granting Catholic Emancipation in the British Isles through Parliament and persuaded a highly reluctant King George IV to grudgingly grant the bill Royal Assent. 

Following Catholic Emancipation, the hierarchy of the Catholic Church in Ireland began an investigation into Archbishop O'Hurley's life and death, as well as those of the other Irish Catholic Martyrs. One of the most valuable resources was found to be the documents and letters written by the men, like Wallop and Loftus, who tortured and executed him. In 1904, the Archbishop was declared a Servant of God.

On 27 September 1992, O'Hurley was beatified by Pope John Paul II, alongside 16 other Irish martyrs.

In popular culture
The Recusant poet Richard Verstegan composed an Elizabethan English elegy about the Archbishop's martyrdom, entitled "The Fall of the Baron of Slane."

See also
 Margaret Ball
 Francis Taylor (martyr)

References

Sources

1530s births
1584 deaths
16th-century Roman Catholic archbishops in Ireland
16th-century Roman Catholic martyrs
16th-century venerated Christians
24 Irish Catholic Martyrs
Academic staff of the Old University of Leuven
Beatifications by Pope John Paul II
Clergy from County Limerick
Executed Irish people
Executed writers
Gaels
Irish beatified people
Irish torture victims
Martyred Roman Catholic bishops
Old University of Leuven alumni
People educated by school in County Tipperary
People executed by the Kingdom of Ireland by hanging
People executed for treason against Ireland
People executed under Elizabeth I as Queen of Ireland
People from County Tipperary
People of Elizabethan Ireland
People of the Second Desmond Rebellion
Reims University (1548–1793)
Roman Catholic archbishops of Cashel
Post-Reformation Roman Catholic bishops in Ireland